Menstruation  is the shedding of the uterine lining (endometrium).  It occurs on a regular basis in uninseminated sexually reproductive-age females of certain mammal species.

Although there is some disagreement in definitions between sources, menstruation is generally considered to be limited to primates. Overt menstruation (where there is bleeding from the uterus through the vagina) is found primarily in humans and close relatives such as chimpanzees.   It is common in simians (Old World monkeys, New World monkeys, and apes), but completely lacking in strepsirrhine primates and possibly weakly present in tarsiers. Beyond primates, it is known only in bats, the elephant shrew, and the spiny mouse species Acomys cahirinus.

Females of other species of placental mammal undergo estrous cycles, in which the endometrium is completely reabsorbed by the animal (covert menstruation) at the end of its reproductive cycle. Many zoologists regard this as different from a "true" menstrual cycle. Female domestic animals used for breeding—for example dogs, pigs, cattle, or horses—are monitored for physical signs of an estrous cycle period, which indicates that the animal is ready for insemination.

Estrus and menstruation 

Females of most mammal species advertise fertility to males with visual behavioral cues, pheromones, or both. This period of advertised fertility is known as oestrus, "estrus" or heat. In species that experience estrus, females are generally only receptive to copulation while they are in heat (dolphins are an exception). In the estrous cycles of most placental mammals, if no fertilization takes place, the uterus reabsorbs the endometrium. This breakdown of the endometrium without vaginal discharge is sometimes called covert menstruation. Overt menstruation (where there is blood flow from the vagina) occurs primarily in humans and close evolutionary relatives such as chimpanzees. Some species, such as domestic dogs, experience small amounts of vaginal bleeding while approaching heat; this discharge has a different physiologic cause than menstruation.

Concealed ovulation

A few mammals do not experience obvious, visible signs of fertility (concealed ovulation). In humans, while women can learn to recognize their own level of fertility (fertility awareness), whether men can detect fertility in women is debated; recent studies have given conflicting results.

Orangutans also lack visible signs of impending ovulation. Also, it has been said that the extended estrus period of the bonobo (reproductive-age females are in heat for 75% of their menstrual cycle)  has a similar effect to the lack of a "heat" in human females.

Evolution
Most female mammals have an estrous cycle, yet only ten primate species, four bat species, the elephant shrew, and one known species of spiny mouse have a menstrual cycle. As these groups are not closely related, it is likely that four distinct evolutionary events have caused menstruation to arise.

There are varying views on evolution of overt menstruation in humans and related species, and the evolutionary advantages in losing blood associated with dismantling the uterine lining rather than absorbing it, as most mammals do. The reason is likely related to differences in the ovulation process.

Most female placental mammals have a uterine lining that builds up when the animal begins ovulation, and later further increases in thickness and blood flow after a fertilized egg has successfully implanted. This final process of thickening is known as decidualization, and is usually triggered by hormones released by the embryo. In humans, decidualization happens spontaneously at the beginning of each menstrual cycle, triggered by hormonal signals from the ovaries. For this reason, the human uterine lining becomes fully thickened during each cycle as a defense to trophoblast penetration of the endometrial wall, regardless of whether an egg becomes fertilized or successfully implants in the uterus. This produces more unneeded material per cycle than in non-menstruating mammals, which may explain why the extra material is not simply reabsorbed as done by those species. In essence, menstruating animals treat every estrous cycle as a possible pregnancy by thickening the protective layer around the endometrial wall, while non-menstruating placental mammals do not begin the pregnancy process until a fertilized egg has implanted in the uterine wall.

For this reason, it is speculated that menstruation is not a trait which provides any evolutionary advantage. Instead it is a side effect of spontaneous decidualization, which evolved in some placental mammals due to its advantages over non-spontaneous decidualization. Spontaneous decidualization allows for more maternal control in the maternal-fetal conflict by increasing selectivity over the implanted embryo. This may be necessary in humans and other primates, due to the abnormally large number of genetic disorders in these species.  Since most aneuploidy events result in stillbirth or miscarriage, there is an evolutionary advantage to ending the pregnancy early, rather than nurturing a fetus that will later miscarry. There is evidence to show that some abnormalities in the developing embryo can be detected by cells in the uterus. This triggers epigenetic changes that prevent formation of the placenta, which prevents the embryo from implanting and leaves it to be removed in the next menstruation. This failsafe mode is not possible in species where decidualization is controlled by hormonal triggers from the embryo. This is sometimes referred to as the choosy uterus theory, and it is theorized that this positive outweighs the negative impacts of menstruation in species with high aneuploidy rates and hence a high number of 'doomed' embryos.

Animal estrous cycles
The female will ovulate spontaneously and be receptive to the male to be bred (express estrus) at regular biologically defined intervals. The female is receptive to males only while experiencing estrus.

For breeding livestock, there are a number of advantages to be gained by finding methods to induce ovulation on a planned schedule, and thus synchronize the estrus cycle between many female animals. If animals can be bred on the same schedule, it increases convenience for the livestock owner, since the young animals will be at the same stage of development. Also, if artificial insemination (AI) is used for breeding, the AI technician's time can be used more efficiently, by breeding several females at the same time.  In order to induce estrus, a variety of techniques have been tried in recent years, involving both more natural, and more hormonal based methods. Different ways of injecting or feeding hormones to livestock are costly, and have variable success rates.

Average length (days) of estrus and estrous cycles:

See also 
 Endometrium
 Estrous cycle
 Breeding pair
 Reproduction
 Animal husbandry

References

External links 
 
 
 

Animal breeding
Animal physiology
Zoology
Menstrual cycle
Mammal female reproductive system